Duchy of Bydgoszcz and Wyszogród was a district principality and a fiefdom within the Kingdom of Poland during the era of fragmentation. It was formed between 1314 and 1315 from part of the Duchy of Inowrocław, and existed until 1323 when it was incorporated back into it. The country was located in the Kuyavia centered around its co-capitals: Bydgoszcz and Wyszogród. Its only ruler was the duke Przemysł of Inowrocław of the Piast dynasty.

History 

Duchy was formed between 12 November 1314 and 6 April 1315, with the partition of the Duchy of Inowrocław that was co-ruled by brothers, Leszek and Przemysł of Inowrocław. Leszek stayed the ruler of remaining lands of Inowrocław while Przemysł was given Bydgoszcz and Wyszogród. The country was located in the Kuyavia centered around its capitals: Bydgoszcz and Wyszogród and formed from the territories castellanies of Bydgoszcz and Wyszogród. 6 April 1315 marks the first mantion in the records of Przemysł as a duke of the state.

On 27 June 1315 near Kraków, Przemysł had joined the alliance of Władysław I Łokietek together with Denmark, Sweden, Rügen, Pomerania-Stettin, Pomerania-Wolgast and Mecklenburg, against the Margraviate of Brandenburg. On 11 June 1318, Leszek and Przemysł had signed the survival agreement, according to which, after the death of one of them, the other was going to inherit their territories.

In 1323, Leszek had abdicated and left Kuyiavia, with Przemysł succeeding his throne and uniting his both states into Duchy of Inowrocław.

List of rulers 
 Przemysł of Inowrocław (1314/1315–1323)

Notes

References 

Former countries in Europe
Former monarchies of Europe
Duchies of Poland
Fiefdoms of Poland
History of Poland during the Piast dynasty
14th-century establishments in Poland
14th-century disestablishments in Poland
States and territories established in 1314
States and territories established in 1315
States and territories disestablished in 1323